Francis Andrew Linden Laidlaw (born 20 September 1940) is a former Scotland international rugby union player

Rugby Union career

Amateur career

He played for Melrose.

Norman Mair once said that Frank Laidlaw regarded the loss of his own ball as he would a family bereavement.

Provincial career

He played for a Scottish Border XV on 10 October 1962 in a warm up for that year's championship and to secure selection to the South side.

He played for South of Scotland District.

He played for the Whites Trial side on 15 December 1962, 9 February 1963 and 2 March 1963.

International career

He was capped thirty-two times for Scotland as a hooker between 1964 and 1971 and captained his country twice. His 1966 game against Wales was what was known as "the Melrose Game" by Bill McLaren because his club, Melrose, had four players on the national side: the others being Alex Hastie, David Chisholm and Jim Telfer. Scotland won 11–5.

He toured twice with the British & Irish Lions:- to Australia and New Zealand in 1966 and New Zealand in 1971.

Outside of rugby

He is a proponent of Scientology.

References

Sources

 Bath, Richard – A Scottish Rugby Miscellany
 McLaren, Bill – Talking of Rugby
 Massie, Allan A Portrait of Scottish Rugby (Polygon, Edinburgh)

1940 births
Living people
Barbarian F.C. players
British & Irish Lions rugby union players from Scotland
Melrose RFC players
Rugby union hookers
Rugby union players from Hawick
Scotland international rugby union players
Scottish rugby union players
Scottish Scientologists
South of Scotland District (rugby union) players
Whites Trial players